Jaczemir is a male given name of Slavic origin, and Jaczemira is the feminine form.

Historical Polish variants: Jaczemirz, Iaczimirz, Yaczmirz, Jaczymierz, Jacmierz. Czech variants: Jačemír, Ječimír. Recorded historical surnames derived from the geographical location with the same name (Jacimierz, Jaćmierz): Yaczimirski, Jaczymirski, Jaczymierski, Jaczemirski, Jaczmyrski, Jaczymirska, Yaczymyrzka, Iaczimirska, etc. The latter location got the name from the given name. The surnames Jacimierski, Jacimirski, Jacymierski, Jacymirski belonged to Bończa coat of arms and Sulima coat of arms.

There is a Ukrainian surname  derived from the Polish one.

Fictional characters 

 Jackamar (in Polish version: Jaczemir), from the game The Witcher 3: Wild Hunt

See also 
 Polish name
 Eastern Slavic naming customs

References 

Slavic masculine given names
Polish masculine given names
Masculine given names
Polish names
Slavic-language names